The Salt Lake County Council is the legislative body of the home rule government of Salt Lake County, Utah. The council consists of nine members, each representing one of the nine districts from which they were elected.

History 
Like most counties in Utah, Salt Lake County was governed by a three-member commission before county voters approved the change to a nine-member council with an elected mayor in 1998 general election. It took effect in 2000, when the first councillors were elected.

Elections 
The county council elections are partisan and held alongside general elections in the presidential and midterm election years. The council members are elected in staggered terms, every two years, one at-large and three district members are elected. The members in odd-numbered districts are elected in midterm election years and the members in even-numbered districts are elected in presidential election years.

Composition 
The council members are elected from nine districts: three alphabetical districts are at large and are elected to six-year terms, while six numerical districts are sectioned into separate districts and elected to four-year terms.

At-large 

The three current at-large council members are Laurie Stringham (Republican), first elected in 2020; Suzanne Harrison (Democratic), first elected in 2022; and Jim Bradley (Democratic), first elected in 2000.

District 1 

District 1 consists of most of Salt Lake City, almost all of South Salt Lake and the northeastern corner of West Valley City. Its current councilmember is Democrat Arlyn Bradshaw.

District 2 

District 2 consists of West Valley City and South Jordan west of Bangerter Highway, a small piece of West Jordan, small pieces of Riverton and Herriman and the unincorporated communities of Kearns and Magna. Its current councilmember is Republican David Alvord.

District 3 

District 3 consists of Taylorsville in its entirety, most of Murray and parts of West Valley City, South Salt Lake, Millcreek and West Jordan. Its current councilmember is Republican Aimee Winder Newton.

District 4 

District 4 encompasses the entire city of Holladay, the far eastern part of Salt Lake City, most of Millcreek and parts of Murray and Cottonwood Heights. Its current councilmember is Democrat Ann Granato.

District 5 

District 5 encompasses the entire city of Bluffdale, most of West Jordan, Riverton and Herriman, South Jordan east of Bangerter Highway, Draper west of I-15, and small slivers of West Valley City, Midvale and Sandy. Its current councilmember is Republican Sheldon Stewart.

District 6 

District 6 encompasses a majority of Draper, Sandy and Midvale and part of Cottonwood Heights. Its current councilmember is Republican Dea Theodore.

Councilmember history 

1) Won special election to succeed her husband Sam Granato after his death.

2) Appointed to succeed Jenny Wilson, who was appointed to Mayor of Salt Lake County.

References

Salt Lake City